The Ames Creek Bridge is an historic structure located northeast of  DeWitt, Iowa, United States  in rural Clinton County.   It is an early example of concrete bridge design prior to the codification of standards by the state highway commission.  The bridge was listed on the National Register of Historic Places in 1981.

Description
The bridge was designed by the Clinton County Engineer. The Clinton County Board of Supervisors contracted with Charlotte, Iowa contractor J.R. Kane in 1912 to build the bridge. The structure was completed that same year for $2,154. There is a minimal amount of ornamentation on the structure. The bridge's concrete abutments and wing walls required almost 125 cubic yards of excavation. It was built a year before the Iowa State Highway Commission began developing standard bridge plans.

References

Bridges completed in 1912
Bridges in Clinton County, Iowa
Road bridges on the National Register of Historic Places in Iowa
National Register of Historic Places in Clinton County, Iowa
1912 establishments in Iowa
Concrete bridges in the United States
Girder bridges in the United States